Thiru Sri Thiagu Vayakkarar was an Indian politician and former Member of the Legislative Assembly of Tamil Nadu. He was elected to the Tamil Nadu legislative assembly as a candidate from Mannargudi constituency in 1946 Legislative Assembly. He belongs to Devendrakula Velalar an agricultural community found in the Indian state of Tamil Nadu.

References

1986 births
Living people
Indian politicians